The Okurodani Formation is an Early Cretaceous geologic formation in central Honshu, Japan. Part of the Tetori Group, it primarily consists of freshwater continental sediments deposited in a floodplain environment, with occasional volcanic tuffite horizons. It has an uncertain age, probably dating between the Hauterivian and Aptian. An indeterminate iguanodontian dinosaur tooth has been recovered from the formation. Many other fossil vertebrates are known from the KO2 locality

Vertebrate Paleobiota

Amphibians

Squamates

Turtles

Choristoderes

See also

 List of dinosaur-bearing rock formations
 List of stratigraphic units with indeterminate dinosaur fossils

Footnotes

References
 Weishampel, David B.; Dodson, Peter; and Osmólska, Halszka (eds.): The Dinosauria, 2nd, Berkeley: University of California Press. 861 pp. .

Lower Cretaceous Series of Asia
Hauterivian Stage